National Institute of Cardiovascular Diseases (NICVD), Bangladesh is a government medical college and cardiac hospital in Bangladesh to provide all type of health care services to cardiac patients. It is located at Sher-e-Bangla Nagor Thana, Dhaka. It covers primary to tertiary health care.


History
National Institute of Cardiovascular Diseases was established in 1978 to ensure complete cardiac care to patients as well as training for physicians, nurses and technicians involved with delivery of cardiac care to meet the increasing demand. In July 1988 the institute introduced Post Graduate medical courses

Criticism 
In October 2016, a private contractor was prevented by the staff from installing Oxygen tubes in the Neonatal Intensive Care Unit of the hospital after the contractor refused to bribe them.

References

Government agencies of Bangladesh
Medical research institutes in Bangladesh
Organisations based in Dhaka
Organizations established in 1978
1978 establishments in Bangladesh
Hospitals in Dhaka
Cardiovascular diseases